Odilon Redon, or The Eye Like a Strange Balloon Mounts Toward Infinity is a Canadian short drama film, directed by Guy Maddin and released in 1995. The film stars Jim Keller and Caelum Vatnsdal as Keller and Caelum, a father and son who compete for the affections of Berenice (Brandy Bayes), a woman they have rescued from a train crash.

The film was commissioned by the BBC as part of a series in which filmmakers were asked to create short films inspired by other artists. Maddin chose French painter Odilon Redon, focusing in particular on The Eye Like a Strange Balloon, one of the charcoal illustrations Redon did for the first published French translation of the works of Edgar Allan Poe.

The film had its theatrical premiere at the 1995 Toronto International Film Festival, where it received an honorable mention from the Best Canadian Short Film award jury.

References

External links
 

1995 films
1995 short films
Films directed by Guy Maddin
1990s English-language films
Canadian drama short films
1990s Canadian films
Canadian avant-garde and experimental short films